Stygobromus ephemerus, commonly called ephemeral cave amphipod, is a troglomorphic species of amphipod in family Crangonyctidae. It is endemic to Virginia in the United States.

References

Freshwater crustaceans of North America
Crustaceans described in 1969
ephemerus
Cave crustaceans
Endemic fauna of Virginia